Meatmen may refer to:
 The Meatmen, an American punk band
 Meatmen (comics), a comics anthology